Marlena is an album by American vocalist Marlena Shaw recorded in 1972 and released on the Blue Note label. The album was Shaw's third release and her first for the Blue Note label.

Track listing
 "What Are You Doing the Rest of Your Life?" (Alan Bergman, Marilyn Bergman, Michel Legrand) - 5:08
 "Somewhere" (Stephen Sondheim, Leonard Bernstein) - 3:28  
 "Runnin' Out of Fools" (Kay Rogers, Richard Ahlert) - 4:48 
 "So Far Away" (Carole King) - 3:58 
 "I'm Gonna Find Out"  (Ralph Harrington) - 3:52    
 "Save the Children" (Al Cleveland, Renaldo Benson, Marvin Gaye) - 4:08
 "You Must Believe in Spring" (Alan Bergman, Marilyn Bergman, Jacques Demy, Michel Legrand) - 4:34  
 "Wipe Away the Evil" (Horace Silver) - 5:01 
 "Things Don't Never Go My Way" (Tommy Faile) - 5:55
Recorded at A&R Studios in New York City on August 10 (tracks 1, 2, 7 & 8) and August 11 (tracks 3-6 & 9) with overdubbed strings recorded on August 16, 1972.

Personnel
Marlena Shaw - vocals
Phil Bodner - flute, oboe, english horn
Derek Smith - piano, electric piano
Paul Griffin - electronic organ, electric piano
Vincent Bell, Jay Berliner, Cornell Dupree - guitar
Richard Davis - double bass
Gordon Edwards - electric bass
Jimmy Johnson - drums
Raymond Orchart - conga
Johnny Pacheco - conga, bongos
Omar Clay - percussion
Wade Marcus - arranger, conductor
Paul Gershman, Louis Haber, Harry Lookofsky, Irving Spice, Louis Stone, Paul Winter - violin
Julian Barber, Seymour Berman - viola
Seymour Barab, Charles McCraken - cello
Eugene Bianco - harp

References

Blue Note Records albums
Marlena Shaw albums
1972 albums
Albums produced by George Butler (record producer)
Albums arranged by Wade Marcus
Vocal jazz albums